Jonathan Lynn (born 3 April 1943) is an English stage and film director, producer, writer, and actor. He is known for directing the comedy films such as Clue, Nuns on the Run, My Cousin Vinny, and The Whole Nine Yards. He also co-created and co-wrote the television series Yes Minister.

Early life
Lynn was born in Bath, Somerset, the son of physician Robin Lynn and sculptor Ruth Helen (née Eban), whose first cousin on her mother's side was the neurologist Oliver Sacks. Another cousin, Caroline Sacks, married Nicholas Samuel, 5th Viscount Bearsted. Lynn was educated at Kingswood School, Bath, between 1954 and 1961, after which he studied law at Pembroke College, Cambridge. (His maternal uncle, Israeli statesman Abba Eban, had also studied at Cambridge in the 1930s.) There he participated in the Cambridge University Footlights Club revue Cambridge Circus (appearing with the revue in 1964 on Broadway and on The Ed Sullivan Show).

Career

Acting
Lynn's first West End appearance was in a stage production of Green Julia, for which he was nominated for the 1965 Plays and Players Award as Most Promising New Actor. In 1967, he played Motel the tailor in the original West End production of Fiddler on the Roof (production recorded by CBS Records). From the late 1960s, Lynn was appearing in and writing television sitcoms, including the television comedy series Twice a Fortnight with Graeme Garden, Bill Oddie, Terry Jones, Michael Palin and Tony Buffery.

Lynn played the Irish medical student Danny Hooley in the second series of the television comedy Doctor in the House in 1970. He wrote some episodes for Doctor at Large, Doctor in Charge, Doctor at Sea and Doctor on the Go. As a TV actor, his most memorable roles included Beryl's boyfriend Robert in early series of The Liver Birds, the role of Harold in Jack Rosenthal's 1976 television film Bar Mitzvah Boy, and the role of Ted Margolis in Rosenthal's The Knowledge (1979). He had a bit-part as a window cleaner in the BBC television series The Good Life. His film appearances have included roles in Prudence and the Pill (1968), The House That Dripped Blood (1971), Romance with a Double Bass (1974), and Three Men and a Little Lady (1990).

Lynn is a guest instructor at HB Studio.

Screenwriting
Lynn's first (co-written) screenplay was for The Internecine Project, which was released in 1974. For television he wrote episodes for the Doctor TV series and On the Buses and wrote for Harry Worth and George Layton before eventually, in partnership with Antony Jay, writing Yes Minister and Yes, Prime Minister. His later writing credits include the first two films he directed, Clue (1985) and Nuns on the Run (1990). He is also known for his co-writing, co-producing, and co-directing of the revived Yes, Prime Minister series produced by the BBC on Gold in 2013.

Books
Lynn co-authored the books The Complete Yes Minister, as well as The Complete Yes Prime Minister, which spent 106 weeks on the Sunday Times top 10 fiction list. Both were ranked number one on the Sunday Times list, including in December 1986 when the books were ranked number one and number two respectively. He also wrote the 1993 novel Mayday. In 2011 Lynn wrote a non-fiction work entitled Comedy Rules. The Independent newspaper called the book "a charming memoir, full of amusing and insightful anecdotes about the many entertainers Lynn has worked with" and described it as a combination of autobiography and how-to manual for comedy. The paper wrote further: "By dovetailing different types of book, Lynn cleverly avoids the pitfalls of both genres. Because it's ostensibly a sort of how-to book, there are no boring childhood reminiscences. Because it's also a kind of autobiography, his no-nonsense dos and don'ts are springboards for entertaining yarns, rather than academic discourse."

Lynn won praise for his direction of the 2010 London stage version of Yes, Prime Minister, which he co-wrote as well.

In 2016 Lynn’s play The Patriotic Traitor was published. Its subject is the relationship of Philippe Pétain to Charles de Gaulle. In the words of the blurb, ‘Two giants of the twentieth century who loved each other like father and son until they found themselves on opposing sides in World War II. In 1945 de Gaulle had his oldest friend tried for treason. Their complex relationship – noble, comic and absurd – changed history.’

Producing
Lynn also produced six episodes of the new Yes, Prime Minister television series, was executive producer of He's Such a Girl, Vanity Fair, and was a producer for Trial and Error. It also received an exclusive production agreement with Columbia Pictures Television in 1992.

Awards
Lynn's work on the Minister series earned him three BAFTAs, two Broadcasting Press Guild Awards, and two Pye Television Writers Awards, and he won the ACE Award for Best Written Comedy Series. The Campaign for Freedom of Information also recognized Lynn with a special award for his work on the show. Lynn was a recipient of a Diamond Jubilee Award for Political Satire in 2010. He received a NAACP Image Award for the 2003 film The Fighting Temptations.

Film director credits
Lynn has directed numerous films, including:
 Clue (1985)
 Nuns on the Run (1990)
 My Cousin Vinny (1992)
 The Distinguished Gentleman (1992)
 Greedy (1994)
 Sgt. Bilko (1996)
 Trial and Error (1997)
 The Whole Nine Yards (2000)
 The Fighting Temptations (2003)
 Wild Target (2010)

See also
 Cambridge Theatre Company

References

Further reading

External links
 Official website
 
 
 

1943 births
20th-century English male writers
20th-century English male actors
21st-century English male writers
21st-century English male actors
20th-century English screenwriters
21st-century British dramatists and playwrights
Alumni of Pembroke College, Cambridge
English film directors
English male comedians
English male stage actors
English male television actors
English people of Israeli descent
English people of Jewish descent
English television writers
Living people
British male television writers
People educated at Kingswood School, Bath
People from Bath, Somerset
Male actors from Somerset
Comedians from Somerset